Monica Iozzi de Castro (Ribeirão Preto, November 2, 1981) is a Brazilian actress and reporter currently appearing on Big Brother Brasil. She formerly was co-host of the afternoon program "Video Show" with Octaviano Costa on the Globo network in Brazil. She's currently focused on acting working.

Career 
She earned a degree in performing arts from Universidade Estadual de Campinas in 2005, then began her career at SESI and then worked with the theater company Os Satyros.

Until 2013 she was one of the reporters of the Custe o Que Custar as the only woman in the team, after winning a competition to be the eighth member of the team in September 2009. She appeared on the Big Brother Brasil 14.

References

External links
 
 

1981 births
Living people
People from Ribeirão Preto
Brazilian people of Italian descent